It's Now or Never is a 2015 Spanish romantic comedy film directed by María Ripoll.

Plot 
Álex (Dani Rovira) and Eva (María Valverde) are a happy couple who, after years of relationship, have decided to marry in the English countryside village (Castle Combe) where they met each other. However, an unexpected problem occurs: a strike of air traffic controllers prevent Álex and his guests from arriving where Eva is waiting.

Cast

Production
The film was shot in Barcelona, Camprodon, and Amsterdam.

Music
The Music was composed by Simon Smith as a happy feel good comedy score with touches of brit pop, punk and jazz. 
Much of the score was also played by Simon Smith, including guitars, bass, piano, drums, violin, trumpet, vocals as well as writing many of the English songs. Other key musicians were brought in to provide baritone sax, lead trumpet, guitars, and double bass. One of them Victor Hernandez is the lead vocal for many of the composed songs ( Crazy for you, Run for what you want etc.)
There are also international songs included such as Alright (from Supergrass), Tick, tick, boom! (Belonging to The Hives), Walk like an Egyptian (The Bangles) and classic Spanish pop, like Te estoy amando locamente (Las Grecas) and Volando voy (Kiko Veneno), among others.

Release
The film had its premiere in Madrid on June 16, 2015, and was released in Spain on June 19.

Reception
The film has grossed  in Spain.

See also 
 List of Spanish films of 2015

References

External links

Spanish romantic comedy films
2015 romantic comedy films
Films shot in Amsterdam
Films shot in Barcelona
Films shot in the province of Girona
Zeta Studios films
Atresmedia Cine films
2010s Spanish films
2010s Spanish-language films